Harold Madison Wright,  (December 10, 1908 – December 11, 1997) was a Canadian engineer and athlete.

Born in Winnipeg, Manitoba, he received a B.Sc in geological engineering and a M.Sc in metallurgical engineering from the University of Utah. He also received an MA in geology from the University of British Columbia. In 1947 he established a consulting firm called Wright Engineers.

He competed in athletics (100 m, 200 m and 4 × 100 m relay) at the 1932 Summer Olympics.

From 1964 to 1968 he was president of the Canadian Field Hockey Association. From 1969 to 1977 he was president of the Canadian Olympic Association, during the first Olympic Games to be hosted in Canada. He also served as director of the Commonwealth Games Association of Canada and the British Columbia Sports Federation.

Honours
Wright is the recipient of the following honours and awards:
 In 1977 he was made an Officer of the Order of Canada and was promoted to Companion in 1986.
 In 1979 he was awarded the Olympic Order in silver.
 In 1981 he was awarded an honorary degree of Doctor of Laws from the University of British Columbia.
 In 1987 he was inducted into the Canadian Amateur Sports Hall of Fame.
 In 2003 he was inducted into Canadian Olympic Hall of Fame.
 He was inducted into the Canadian Mining Hall of Fame.

References

External links
 
 
 
 

1908 births
1997 deaths
Athletes (track and field) at the 1932 Summer Olympics
Canadian male sprinters
Companions of the Order of Canada
Athletes from Winnipeg
Olympic track and field athletes of Canada
Utah Utes men's track and field athletes
University of British Columbia Faculty of Science alumni
Recipients of the Olympic Order
20th-century Canadian geologists
Canadian expatriates in the United States
Presidents of the Canadian Olympic Committee